Kessarin Ektawatkul (Thai: เกศริน เอกธวัชกุล), nicknamed Nui (นุ้ย), is a Thai film actress and singer.

Career 

A former national champion in taekwondo, she has been featured in several martial arts films, including Born to Fight (2004), Dangerous Flowers (Chai Lai Angels) (2006), Somtum (Muay Thai Giant) (2008), Final Target (Vanquisher) (2009) and Vengeance of an Assassin (2014).

Discography 
 เบื่อ - Silly Fools
 ไม่โกรธแต่ไม่ลืม 
 
 Baby I'm ร้อน
 อะระมากะดู (Aramagadu)

Awards 
 2011: Kessarin Ektawatkul was ranked 6th in FHM's 100 Sexiest Women in Thailand 2011.

References

External links

 

1981 births
Living people
Kessarin Ektawatkul
Kessarin Ektawatkul
Kessarin Ektawatkul
Kessarin Ektawatkul
Kessarin Ektawatkul
Kessarin Ektawatkul